Manmohan is a poet and linguist of Punjabi language. He was honoured with the Sahitya Akademi Award in 2013 for his novel Nirvaan. Nirvaan is the  first novel of Manmohan.  In this novel he has presented the reality which he studied and lived through experience in past years of life.        
।"

Writings

Collection of poetry books
Agle Chaurahe Takk (1982)
Mann Mahial (1989)
Mere Mein Chandni (1993), Hindi
Sur Sanket (1998)
Nmitt (2001)
ath (2004) 
Neelkanth
Dooje Shabdan 'ch
Baikhri (2013)

Novel
 Nirvaan (2011)

Criticism and others
 Vichar Chintan and Others (2003) 
 Partakhan te Pripekh (2005)
  Book About Drida(2006)
 Michael Phooko  (2000)
 Mikhail Bakhtin (2012)
The Structure of Gurmukhi Orthography’ (2009)

Translations
 Shikari Dian Yadan  (2001)
 Akhri Ticket (2006) 
 Indira Gandhi (Writer Inder Malhotra, 2007)

References

Year of birth missing (living people)
Living people
Punjabi-language poets
Recipients of the Sahitya Akademi Award in Punjabi